The women's synchronized trampoline competition at the 2015 European Games was held at the National Gymnastics Arena on 19 and 21 June 2015.

Qualification

Final

References 

Women's synchronized trampoline